Lamay Monastery or Lamay Gonpa is a Buddhist monastery in Bumthang, Bhutan. It is located four kilometers (two and a half miles) above the Jakar Dzong and was built by the Trongsa Penlop, Sonam Drugel, the great-grandfather of King Ugyen Wangchuck in the 19th century. Wangchuck restored the building and it was used as the residence of his two daughters. The palace's main tower was destroyed due to structural problems. Today the building houses the Forestry Institute.

References

Palaces in Bhutan
Buddhist monasteries in Bhutan
Tibetan Buddhist monasteries
Tibetan Buddhism in Bhutan